The 6th Cavalry Division (6-ya Kavaleriiskaya Diviziya) was a cavalry formation of the Russian Imperial Army.

Organization
1st Cavalry Brigade
6th Regiment of Dragoons
6th Uhlan Regiment
2nd Cavalry Brigade
6th Regiment of Hussars
6th Regiment of Cossacks
6th Horse Artillery Division

Chiefs of Staff
1884–1886: Vladimir Alexandrovich Bekman

References

Cavalry divisions of the Russian Empire
Military units and formations disestablished in 1918